Hadley Airport  is a public use airport owned by the U.S. Bureau of Land Management and located four nautical miles (7 km) southwest of the central business district of Round Mountain, a town in Nye County, Nevada, United States.

History 
In the 1930s, American World War I flying ace Kenneth R. Unger ran a flying school and air shows from the airport.

Facilities and aircraft 
It contains one runway designated 17/35 which has an asphalt surface measuring 6,776 x 60 feet (2,065 x 18 m). For the 12-month period ending June 30, 2005, the airport had 2,000 general aviation aircraft operations, an average of 166 per month.

References

External links 
  from Nevada DOT
 Aerial image as of October 1999 from USGS The National Map
 

Airports in Nevada
Transportation in Nye County, Nevada
Buildings and structures in Nye County, Nevada
Bureau of Land Management